Back in the World (subtitled Live) is a live album by Paul McCartney composed of highlights from his spring 2002 "Driving USA" tour in the United States in support of McCartney's 2001 release Driving Rain. It was released internationally in 2003, save for North America – where Back in the U.S. saw issue four months earlier in 2002 – to commemorate his first set of concerts in almost ten years.

Using most of the musicians that appeared on Driving Rain, McCartney assembled a new live act composed of Rusty Anderson and Brian Ray on guitar, Abe Laboriel Jr. on drums, and keyboardist Paul "Wix" Wickens, who had been on McCartney's last two tours in 1989–90 and 1993.

Controversy
Although McCartney was promoting Driving Rain, the majority of his shows would be celebrations of his past, with a substantial sampling of his solo work with and without Wings, but in particular his Beatles hits, and it was the release of those particular songs on Back in the US that sparked one of McCartney's biggest controversies in ages. Despite keeping the famous Lennon–McCartney credit intact on Tripping the Live Fantastic, Unplugged (The Official Bootleg) and Paul Is Live, McCartney decided to reverse the credits to "Paul McCartney and John Lennon" much to Yoko Ono's public annoyance. Reportedly, McCartney had decided to act in response to Ono's recent dropping of his credit from "Give Peace a Chance" on Lennon Legend: The Very Best of John Lennon in 1997. While there continues to be division among critics and fans over McCartney's move, John Lennon never publicly objected to the original credit reversal that appeared on 1976's Wings over America, four years before Lennon's death. Undeterred by Ono's anger, McCartney swapped the credits again on Back in the World in 2003.

Differences
The main difference between Back in the US and Back in the World is that "Vanilla Sky" has been dropped from the latter's first disc, while two of the tracks from the second disc ("C Moon" and the post-9/11 "Freedom") have been replaced with four exclusive songs not found on Back in the US: "Calico Skies", "Michelle", "Let 'Em In" and "She's Leaving Home". Another difference is that the version of "Hey Jude" on Back in the World comes from a different show than the version on Back in the US.

Release
Upon its release, Back in the World far outperformed Driving Rain in the UK, reaching No. 5 and becoming a major hit for McCartney.

Track listing 
All songs by Lennon–McCartney except where noted.

Disc one 
 "Hello, Goodbye" – 3:46
 "Jet" (Paul McCartney/Linda McCartney) – 4:02
 "All My Loving" – 2:08
 "Getting Better" – 3:10
 "Coming Up" (Paul McCartney) – 3:26
 "Let Me Roll It" (Paul McCartney/Linda McCartney) – 4:24
 "Lonely Road" (Paul McCartney) – 3:12
 "Driving Rain" (Paul McCartney) – 3:11
 "Your Loving Flame" (Paul McCartney) – 3:28
 "Blackbird" – 2:30
 "Every Night" (Paul McCartney) – 2:51
 "We Can Work It Out" – 2:29
 "Mother Nature's Son" – 2:11
 "You Never Give Me Your Money"/"Carry That Weight" – 3:05
 "The Fool on the Hill" – 3:09
 "Here Today" (Paul McCartney) – 2:28
 McCartney's tribute to John Lennon
 "Something" (George Harrison) – 2:33
 A tribute cover of George Harrison's song, played on the ukulele – one of Harrison's favourite instruments

Disc two 
 "Eleanor Rigby" – 2:17
 "Here, There and Everywhere" – 2:23
 "Calico Skies" (Paul McCartney) – 2:38
 Performed at the Osaka Dome, Osaka, Japan
 "Michelle" – 3:15
 Performed in Mexico City
 "Band on the Run" (Paul McCartney/Linda McCartney) – 5:00
 "Back in the U.S.S.R." – 2:56
 "Maybe I'm Amazed" (Paul McCartney) – 4:47
 "Let 'Em In" (Paul McCartney) – 5:23
 Performed at the Tokyo Dome, Tokyo, Japan
 "My Love" (Paul McCartney/Linda McCartney) – 4:04
 "She's Leaving Home" – 3:52
 Performed in Mexico City
 "Can't Buy Me Love" – 2:11
 "Live and Let Die" (Paul McCartney/Linda McCartney) – 3:05
 "Let It Be" – 3:58
 "Hey Jude" – 7:35
 Performed in Mexico City; on "Back in the U.S.", the song is performed in New York City.
 "The Long and Winding Road" – 3:30
 "Lady Madonna" – 2:21
 "I Saw Her Standing There" – 3:08
 "Yesterday" – 2:08
 "Sgt. Pepper's Lonely Hearts Club Band (Reprise)" / "The End" – 4:40

Personnel 
 Paul McCartney : Vocals, bass, guitars, piano
 Brian Ray : Guitars, bass, backing vocals
 Rusty Anderson : Guitars, backing vocals
 Paul Wickens : Keyboards, piano, organ, synthesizers, backing vocals
 Abe Laboriel Jr. : Drums

Charts

Weekly charts

Year-end charts

References 

Albums produced by Paul McCartney
Albums produced by David Kahne
Paul McCartney live albums
2003 live albums
Parlophone live albums